Curry is an unincorporated community in Allegheny County, Pennsylvania, later renamed Broughton.

Geography of Allegheny County, Pennsylvania